Mehragan-e Pain (also Romanized as Mehragān-e Pā‘īn; also known as Mehrakān-e Pā‘īn) is a village in Howmeh Rural District, in the Central District of Bandar Lengeh County, Hormozgan Province, Iran. At the 2006 census, its population was 208, in 35 families.

References 

Populated places in Bandar Lengeh County